Arne Sunnegårdh (4 August 1907 in Stockholm – 30 March 1972 in Danderyd, Stockholm County) was a Swedish vocal teacher and church musician.

Biography 
Sunnegårdh was active in Stockholm as the choirmaster at the Royal Swedish Opera, as a vocalist at the Royal College of Music, Stockholm and as a church musician (choir leader) in St. John's Church, Stockholm. He followed some song training with Modest Menzinsky. Erik Saedén was among Sunnegårdh's students.

He was awarded the title of professor by the government in 1963.

His children  and Erika Sunnegårdh are opera singers.

External links  
 Arne Sunnegårdh on Diskogs
 Arne Sunnegårdh on Kungliga Hovkapellet

Members of the Royal Swedish Academy of Music
Swedish music educators
Musicians from Stockholm
1907 births
1972 deaths
20th-century Swedish male musicians